Tetraneuralia is a proposed clade of spiralian bilaterians uniting the phyla Mollusca and Entoprocta. First proposed in 2009 based on similarities between entoproct larvae and polyplacophoran molluscs, it was recovered in 2019 in a phylogenomic study by Marlétaz et al.

Phylogeny 

In the most recent study, Tetraneuralia was recovered at the base of Lophotrochozoa.

References 

Controversial taxa
Bilaterian taxa
Lophotrochozoa